Wapachewunak 192D is an Indian reserve of the English River First Nation in Saskatchewan. It is north of Lac Île-à-la-Crosse.

References

Indian reserves in Saskatchewan
Division No. 18, Saskatchewan